Julius Lloyd-Long (born 28 May 1977) is an American-born New Zealander professional boxer who resides in Auckland. He is best known for his physical stature, standing  and having a  reach. Outside of the ring, Long is a professional chef.

Professional career
Julius Long turned professional on January 17, 2001 at the age of 23 years. He won his first contest by first round stoppage. He has been a journeyman throughout his career, and has fought notable opponents such as former WBC heavyweight champion Samuel Peter, Olympic gold medalists; Audley Harrison and Odlanier Solis, as well as several heavyweight title contenders. In 2013, Duco Events flew Long to New Zealand to help train David Tua in his bout against Alexander Ustinov. Long decided to move to New Zealand permanently.

Professional boxing titles
World Boxing Association 
Interim WBA Oceania Heavyweight title (283¼ lbs)

Professional boxing record

Awards and recognitions
2019 Gladrap Boxing Awards New Zealand fight of the year (Nominated)
2019 Gladrap Boxing Awards Most Entertaining Boxer of the year (Nominated)

References

External links
 

1977 births
Living people
Boxers from Auckland
Boxers from Michigan
New Zealand male boxers
Heavyweight boxers